Annexin A13 is a protein that in humans is encoded by the ANXA13 gene.

Function 

This gene encodes a member of the annexin family. Members of this calcium-dependent phospholipid-binding protein family play a role in the regulation of cellular growth and in signal transduction pathways. The specific function of this gene has not yet been determined; however, it is associated with the plasma membranes of undifferentiated, proliferating endothelial cells and differentiated villus enterocytes. Alternatively spliced transcript variants encoding different isoforms have been identified.

References

External links

Further reading